Nem chua rán is one of the best-known foods eaten by teenagers in Vietnam.

Ingredients 
 Pork meat
 Pork skin
 Garlic
 Fish sauce
 Spices
 Cucumbers, papayas, chilli sauce

How to make it 
 Making nem: To make sour fried spring rolls, you should use sweet nem, or nem chua just finished, not fermented silage. Note: after the rolls mixing is finished, you do not use banana leaves, squeeze rolls into bite-size pieces. To rolls around 3–5 hours is the most delicious fried.
 Tempura: Roll each piece of dough fried rolls over ruffled. If you like, you can roll over a layer of flour, one egg layers and finally rolling over ruffled fried dough. This is done exactly the same as when cooked meat fried or cheese sticks.
 Fry: Let oil into a frying pan, heat, and then let each roll fried until golden, pick up for oil drain.

Finished 
 Nem chua rán is served with chilli sauce and cucumbers or papayas.

See more 
Spring rolls

References 

Vietnamese cuisine